Monday Night Baseball was a live game telecast of Major League Baseball that aired on Monday nights during the regular season.

These games formerly aired weekly on ESPN. The game started at 7 p.m. ET, following SportsCenter, and usually lasted around three hours leading up to an hour-long Baseball Tonight. The program sometimes aired on ESPN2 rather than ESPN, often due to NBA playoff coverage in April and May, and preseason Monday Night Football coverage in August.

Beginning with the 2022 Major League Baseball season, ESPN significantly reduced their MLB schedule, which included cutting their Monday Night Baseball games. Monday night games now occasionally air on Fox Sports 1 and MLB Network.

Earlier incarnations of Monday Night Baseball aired on NBC and then ABC in the 1970s and '80s.

Current

Features
Several things changed to Monday Night Baseball in the eight year television contract that ESPN signed with Major League Baseball on September 14, 2005. Unlike Sunday Night Baseball, the game is non-exclusive, meaning it will co-exist with the teams' local carriers. However, Monday Night Baseball will be allowed to co-exist with local carriers up to three times per club, per year. Beyond that, telecasts will be blacked out in the participating teams' markets (Baseball Tonight is shown in its entirety, beginning at 10:00, with the rest of the nation joining after the game).

Beginning in 2007, there was expected to be an afternoon "batting practice" program generally from the site of the Monday Night Baseball game (similar to the pre-game shows for ESPN's NFL coverage). That program was scheduled to debut on April 9, 2007, at 4 p.m. Eastern time, before the New York Yankees-Minnesota Twins game. However, no batting practice show appeared for reasons that were not explained. Later, ESPN announced that it would also scale back its on-site presence for NFL games.

Because ESPN airs Monday Night Football games, beginning with the pre-season games in mid-August, Monday Night Baseball games either move to ESPN2 or, since 2009, ESPN will broadcast a Wednesday doubleheader with the regularly scheduled Wednesday Night Baseball. On some occasions ESPN will have two scheduled games aired simultaneously, with the one game airing on ESPN and the second on ESPN2. Both telecasts are branded with the Wednesday Night Baseball name, but Dave O'Brien, Rick Sutcliffe and Aaron Boone still call one of the two games.

In the past, the Monday night team would broadcast on Friday night during the NFL season instead of irony for the Wednesday night doubleheader format.

In 2021, ESPN agreed to a new contract with Major League Baseball through the 2028 season. However, the deal included only around 30 exclusive broadcasts, most of which would take place on Sunday Night Baseball. Thus, it is likely that Monday Night Baseball may move to Fox Sports 1, and MLB Network as part of the MLB Network Showcase package.

Commentators
A complete list of broadcasters, with their period of tenure on the show (beginning years of each season shown).

ESPN
Erin Andrews: (field reporter, 2004–2007)
Jason Benetti: (play-by-play, 2021, select games)
Chris Berman: (play-by-play, 1992)
Aaron Boone: (analyst, 2010–2015)
Dallas Braden: (analyst, 2015, second half of season; 2016–2017)
Bob Carpenter: (play-by-play, 1993)
Dave Flemming: (play-by-play, 2015–2021, select games)
Doug Glanville: (analyst, 2021, select games)
Tony Gwynn: (analyst, 2002–2005)
Tom Hart: (play-by-play, 2021, select games)
Orel Hershiser: (analyst, 2008–2010)
Tommy Hutton: (analyst, 1992–1993)
Tim Kurkjian: (field reporter, 2011–2014; analyst, lead color commentator 2017–2021)
Sean McDonough: (play-by-play, 2011–2012)
Tom Mees: (play-by-play, 1992)
Jessica Mendoza: (analyst, 2020–2021, select games)
Mark Mulder: (analyst, 2014; 2015, first half of season)
Dave O'Brien: (play-by-play, 2002–2007, 2013–2015)
Eduardo Pérez: (lead color commentator, 2016–2021)
Kyle Peterson: (analyst, 2020–2021, select games)
Steve Phillips: (analyst, 2008–2009)
Karl Ravech: (lead play-by-play, 2016–2021, select games)
Curt Schilling: (analyst, 2016)
Dan Shulman: (play-by-play, 2008–2010)
Chris Singleton: (analyst, 2010)
Larry Sorenson: (analyst, 1992–1993)
Rick Sutcliffe: (analyst, 2002–2007, 2011–2013)
Gary Thorne: (play-by-play, 1993)

Gwynn was not available to cover early season games due to the fact that he was also the head baseball coach at San Diego State University.

Controversy
On May 10, 2006, after a long day of drinking and golfing with comedian Bill Murray, MNB analyst Rick Sutcliffe attended a night game between the San Diego Padres and Milwaukee Brewers in San Diego. He was invited to the booth with 4SD broadcasters Mark Grant and Matt Vasgersian where he began a rambling and incoherent interview by saying, "It ain't that busy, it ain't that busy." He then rambled on about off-the-wall subjects such as George Clooney and his daughter's "mission." After he asked Matt Vasgersian what he was still doing in San Diego, his microphone was finally cut off.

As a result, he apologized and ESPN suspended Sutcliffe for one game the next week.

Monday Night Baseball on other networks

FS1 (2016, 2020-present)

FS1 has aired Monday night games as well:

History (1967–1988)

The NBC years (1966–1975)

Monday Night Baseball was born on October 19, 1966, when NBC signed a three-year contract to televise the game. Under the deal, NBC paid roughly $6 million per year for the 25 Games of the Week, $6.1 million for the 1967 World Series and 1967 All-Star Game, and $6.5 million for the 1968 World Series and 1968 All-Star Game. This brought the total value of the contract (which included three Monday night telecasts each season) up to $30.6 million.

From 1972–1975 NBC televised Monday games under a contract worth $72 million. In 1973, NBC extended the Monday night telecasts to 15 straight (with a local blackout). September 1, 1975 saw NBC's last Monday Night Baseball game, in which the Montréal Expos beat the Philadelphia Phillies 6–5.

Curt Gowdy called the Monday night games with Tony Kubek from 1972 to 1974, the pair being joined in 1973 and 1974 by various guest commentators from both in and out of the baseball world. Jim Simpson and Maury Wills called the secondary backup games. Joe Garagiola hosted NBC's pregame show, The Baseball World of Joe Garagiola, and teamed with Gowdy to call the games in 1975.

The ABC years (1976–1988)

ABC would pick up the television rights for Monday Night Baseball games in the following year. Just like with Monday Night Football, ABC brought in the concept of the three-man-booth (originally composed of Bob Prince, Bob Uecker, and Warner Wolf as the primary crew) to their baseball telecasts.

Ratings were typically poor for ABC's Monday night games, and by 1986, ABC only televised 13 Monday Night Baseball games. This was a fairly sharp contrast to the 18 games to that were scheduled in 1978. The Sporting News suggested that ABC paid Major League Baseball to not make them televise the regular season, opining that the network only wanted the sport for October anyway. For most of its time on ABC, the Monday night games were held on "dead travel days" when few games were scheduled. The team owners liked that arrangement, as the ABC games didn't compete against their stadium box offices and local telecasts. The network, on the other hand, found the arrangement far more complicated; ABC often had only one or two games to pick from for each telecast from a schedule designed by Major League Baseball. While trying to give all of the teams national exposure, ABC ended up with a surplus of games involving games between either small-market teams and/or teams with losing records.

In 1989 (the final year of ABC's contract with Major League Baseball), ABC moved the baseball telecasts to Thursday nights in hopes of getting a leg up against NBC's Cosby Show. The network also aired some late-season games on Sunday afternoons.

The FX cable channel aired Monday night games in 1997. The series returned in 2002 as ESPN (which, like ABC by that point, was owned by The Walt Disney Company) created a package under its deal for national cable rights.

ABC's MNB announcers

Play-by-play
Gary Bender (1987–1988)
Don Drysdale (1978–1986)
Keith Jackson (1977–1982, 1986)
Jim Lampley (1977–1979)
Al Michaels (1976–1989)
Bob Prince (1976)
Gary Thorne (1989)
Bob Uecker (1976–1982)

Color commentary
Lou Brock (1980)
Norm Cash (1976)
Howard Cosell (1977–1985)
Don Drysdale (1978–1986)
Bob Gibson (1976–1977)
Tim McCarver (1984–1989)
Joe Morgan (1988–1989)
Jim Palmer (1984–1989)
Steve Stone (1982–1983)
Bob Uecker (1976–1982)
Earl Weaver (1983–1984)
Bill White (1976–1979)
Warner Wolf (1976–1977)

See also
Sunday Night Baseball
Tuesday Night Baseball
Wednesday Night Baseball
Thursday Night Baseball
MLB Network Showcase
Fox Major League Baseball
Major League Baseball on ESPN Radio
ESPN Major League Baseball broadcasters
Major League Baseball on ESPN Radio broadcasters
List of current Major League Baseball broadcasters

References

Sports Business Daily
Press Release: ESPN’s Signature MLB Franchises Return - Sunday, Monday and Wednesday Night Baseball

External links
 
 Baseball on ESPN.tv
 MLB on ESPN.com
 Searchable Network TV Broadcasts

1967 American television series debuts
1988 American television series endings
2002 American television series debuts
1970s American television series
1990s American television series
2010s American television series
ESPN original programming
Major League Baseball on television
Major League Baseball on NBC
American Broadcasting Company original programming
ABC Sports
American television series revived after cancellation